Chaubardiella is a genus of flowering plants from the Cymbidieae of the orchid family, Orchidaceae, native to Costa Rica and South America.

Chaubardiella dalessandroi Dodson & Dalström - Ecuador
Chaubardiella delcastilloi D.E.Benn. & Christenson - Peru
Chaubardiella hirtzii Dodson - Ecuador, Peru
Chaubardiella pacuarensis Jenny - Costa Rica 
Chaubardiella pubescens Ackerman - Colombia
Chaubardiella serrulata D.E.Benn. & Christenson - Peru
Chaubardiella subquadrata (Schltr.) Garay - Costa Rica, Colombia, Ecuador
Chaubardiella tigrina (Garay & Dunst.) Garay - Colombia, Ecuador, Peru, Venezuela, Suriname, Guyana, French Guinea

See also
 List of Orchidaceae genera

References

 Pridgeon, A.M., Cribb, P.J., Chase, M.A. & Rasmussen, F. eds. (2009). Genera Orchidacearum, Volume 5. Epidendroideae (Part Two). Oxford University Press
 Berg Pana, H. 2005. Handbuch der Orchideen-Namen. Dictionary of Orchid Names. Dizionario dei nomi delle orchidee. Ulmer, Stuttgart

External links

Zygopetalinae genera
Zygopetalinae